Melamine foam is a foam-like material consisting of a melamine-formaldehyde condensate. It is the active component of a number of abrasive cleaner sponges, notably the Magic Eraser.

It is also used as thermal insulation and as a soundproofing material.

Properties 

The open-cell foam is microporous and its polymeric substance is very hard, so that when used for cleaning it works like extremely fine sandpaper, getting into tiny grooves and pits in the object being cleaned. On a larger scale, the material feels soft because the reticulated foam bubbles interconnect. Its structure is a 3D network of very hard strands, when compared to the array of separate bubbles in a material such as styrofoam.

Cleaning 

In the early 21st century, it was discovered that melamine foam is an effective abrasive cleaner. Rubbing with a slightly moistened foam may remove otherwise "uncleanable" external markings from surfaces. For example, melamine foam can remove crayon, marker pen, and grease from painted walls and wood finishings, plastic-adhering paints from treated wooden tables, and adhesive residue and grime from hubcaps. If the surface being cleaned is not sufficiently hard, it may be finely scratched by the melamine material. Similarly to a pencil eraser, the foam wears away during use, leaving behind a slight residue which can be rinsed off.

Other uses 

It is also used as insulation for pipes and ductwork, and as a soundproofing material for studios, sound stages, auditoriums, and the like. The low smoke and flame properties of melamine foam prevent it from being a fire hazard. It is also used as the main sound and thermal insulation material for bullet trains, due to its high sound absorption, excellent thermal insulation performance and light weight.

See also 

 Melamine resin

References

External links 

 BASF Story about Mr. Clean Magic Eraser
 Basotect
 VIXUM
 Re: spot cleaning walls in gallery
 Dangerous Chemicals in Mr. Clean Magic Eraser Snopes.com article debunking rumour about supposed dangerous chemicals in Magic Eraser

Cleaning tools
BASF
Insulators
Artificial materials
Abrasives